Stephen J. Mellor (born 1952) is an American computer scientist, developer of the Ward–Mellor method for real-time computing, the Shlaer–Mellor method,  and Executable UML, and signatory to the Agile Manifesto.

Biography 
Mellor received a BA in computer science from the University of Essex in 1974, and started working at CERN in Geneva, Switzerland as a programmer in BCPL. In 1977 he became software engineer at the Lawrence Berkeley Laboratory, and in 1982 consultant at Yourdon, Inc.

At Yourdon in cooperation with Paul Ward they developed the Ward–Mellor method, and published the book-series Structured Development for Real Time Systems in 1985.

Together with Sally Shlaer he founded Project Technology in 1985. That company was acquired by Mentor Graphics in 2004. Mellor stayed as chief scientist of the Embedded Systems Division at Mentor Graphics for another two years, and is self-employed since 2006.

Since 1998 Mellor has contributed to the Object Management Group, chairing the consortium that added executable actions to the UML, and the specification of model-driven architecture (MDA). He is also chairing the advisory board of the IEEE Software magazine. Since 2013, Mellor has served as CTO for the Industrial Internet Consortium.

Publications 
 1985. Structured Development for Real-Time Systems: Essential Modeling Techniques. With Paul T. Ward. Prentice Hall.
 1986. Structured Development for Real-Time Systems: Implementation Modeling Techniques (Structured Development for Real-Time Systems Vol. 1). With Paul T. Ward. Prentice Hall.
 1988. Object Oriented Systems Analysis: Modeling the World in Data. With Sally Shlaer. Prentice Hall.
 1992. Object Life Cycles: Modeling the World In States. With Sally Shlaer. Prentice Hall.
 2002. Executable UML: A Foundation for Model Driven Architecture. With Marc J. Balcer. Addison-Wesley.
 2004. MDA Distilled. With Kendall Scott, Axel Uhl, Dirk Weise. Addison-Wesley.

Articles, a selection:
 1989. "An object-oriented approach to domain analysis" with S. Shlaer. In: ACM SIGSOFT Software Engineering Notes. Vol 14–5, July 1989. pp. 66–77.
 1997. "Why explore object methods, patterns, and architectures?" with Ralph Johnson. In: IEEE Software. Vol. 14, no. 1, pp. 27–29. 
 1999. "Softwareplatform-independent, precise action specifications for UML". With S. Tockey, R. Arthaud, P. LeBlanc - The Unified Modeling ..., 1999.
 2002. "Make models be assets". In: Commun. ACM Vol 45–11. pp. 76–78.
 2003. "A framework for aspect-oriented modeling". Paper from 4th (AOSD) Modeling With (UML) Workshop, October 2003.
 2004. "Agile MDA" White paper 2004.

See also 
 Data flow
 State transition

References

External links 

 Stephen J. Mellor homepage
 R. Whetton, M. Jones and D. Murray, "The use of Ward and Mellor Structured Methodology for the design of a complex real time system," IEE Colloquium on Computer Aided Software Engineering Tools for Real-Time Control, 1991, pp. 5/1-5/4.
 Ward and Mellor methodology.

1952 births
Living people
British computer scientists
Alumni of the University of Essex
People associated with CERN
Real-time technology
Real-time computing
Agile software development